Košarkarski klub Šentjur, commonly referred to as KK Šentjur or simply Šentjur, is a basketball team based in Šentjur, Slovenia. The team currently competes in the Premier A Slovenian League.

History
The club was founded in 1969 as a basketball section of TVD Partizan. In the 2014–15 season, Šentjur won its first domestic title. Despite being ranked only fifth in the regular season, Šentjur upset Krka in the semifinals and beat Rogaška 3–1 in the finals.

Honours
League
Slovenian First League
Winners: 2014–15

Slovenian Second League
Winners: 1999–2000

Cup
Slovenian Basketball Cup
Runners-up: 2021

Slovenian Supercup
Winners: 2015

References

External links
 Official website 
 

Basketball teams in Slovenia
Basketball teams established in 1969
1969 establishments in Yugoslavia
Basketball teams in Yugoslavia